Narinder Bragta (15 September 1952 – 5 June 2021) was a Member of the Himachal Pradesh Legislative Assembly for Jubbal-Kotkhai from 2017 till his death in June 2021. Bragta previously served from 2007 till 2012.

References

1952 births
2021 deaths
Himachal Pradesh politicians
Bharatiya Janata Party politicians from Himachal Pradesh
Himachal Pradesh MLAs 2007–2012
Deaths from the COVID-19 pandemic in India
People from Shimla district
Himachal Pradesh MLAs 2017–2022